Mycobacterium botniense is a slowly growing Mycobacterium, which produces a yellow pigment.  It was first isolated from a stream of water. M. botniense is most closely related to Mycobacterium xenopi. Etymology: botniense; of Botnia, referring to the Latin name of the province of Finland from which the isolation was made.

Description
Microscopy
Gram-positive, nonmotile and acid-fast rods.

Colony characteristics
Colonies on Löwenstein-Jensen media and on Middlebrook 7H11 agar are small, dysgonic and scotochromogenic, and produce yellow pigment.

Physiology
Visible growth from diluted inocula requires 5 to 8 weeks. Growth occurs at 37 to 50 °C.
The type strain is positive for 10-d arylsulfatase and pyrazinamidase.
Negative for 3-d arylsulfatase, urease, nitrate reductase, semi-quantitative catalase, heat-stable catalase, acid phosphatase, b-galactosidase and 5% NaCl tolerance.
Tween 80 is not hydrolysed in 10 d.

Differential characteristics
A phylogenetic tree based on the evaluation of 16S rDNA sequences places M. botniense among the slow-growing mycobacteria, closest to M. xenopi.

Pathogenesis
Not known, but first isolated from an environmental source.

Type strain
First isolated in Finland from stream waters.  Strain E347 = ATCC 700701 = CCUG 47976 = CIP 106753 = DSM 44537.

References

Torkko P. 2000., Mycobacterium xenopi and related organisms isolated from stream waters in Finland and description of Mycobacterium botniense sp. nov. Int. J. Syst. Evol. Microbiol., 50, 283–289.

External links
Type strain of Mycobacterium botniense at BacDive -  the Bacterial Diversity Metadatabase

Acid-fast bacilli
botniense
Bacteria described in 2000